John Mattke (born October 29, 1958) is a former professional tennis player from the United States.

Biography
Mattke was born in Minneapolis and came to Gustavus Adolphus College in 1977. While studying for a business degree he spent four years on the college's tennis team. He finished with a 132-31 record in singles and was the 1980 NAIA singles champion. In doubles he was 135-20, having formed a strong doubles partnership with Paul Holbach, which culminated in them winning the 1980 NCAA Division III doubles championship.

In 1983 he had his first year touring as a professional and made a Grand Prix quarter-final in the Washington Open doubles, with Chile's Juan Carlos Ayala.

His most noteworthy performance came at the Tokyo Outdoor Grand Prix tournament in 1984 where in the second round he upset the world's fifth ranked player Andrés Gómez, who was also the tournament's top seed.

At the 1984 Australian Open, Mattke made his only main draw appearance in singles and had a four-set win over Paul Kronk in the first round, before losing to New Zealander Bruce Derlin.

He won two Challenger titles during his career, both in doubles.

Still living in Minnesota, Mattke works as an executive at granite company Coldspring.

Challenger titles

Doubles: (2)

References

External links
 
 

1958 births
Living people
American male tennis players
Gustavus Adolphus College alumni
Tennis people from Minnesota
Sportspeople from Minneapolis
College men's tennis players in the United States